Jorge Luis Moreira Ferreira (born 1 February 1990) is a Paraguayan footballer who plays as a right back for River Plate.

Club career

2 de Mayo
Born in Villarrica, Moreira started his career with 2 de Mayo, as a midfielder. Promoted to the first team in June 2009, he made his first team – and Primera División – debut on 20 June, coming on as a late substitute for Domingo Martínez in a 2–1 away loss against Nacional.

Moreira scored his first professional goal on 14 August 2009, netting the fourth in a 5–0 home routing of Tacuary. He finished his first senior season with two goals in 16 appearances.

Libertad
In December 2009, Moreira moved to Libertad ahead of the ensuing campaign. In 2011, after the injury of Carlos Bonet, he was converted into a right back by manager Gregorio Pérez, and started to feature regularly in that position onwards.

Whilst at the club, Moreira won five league titles and scored six goals.

River Plate
On 21 July 2016, Moreira moved abroad for the first time in his career, joining Argentine Primera División side River Plate after agreeing to a four-year contract. He made his debut abroad ten days later, starting in a 3–0 Copa Argentina home defeat of CS Rivadavia Venado Tuerto.

Moreira made his top tier debut on 28 August 2016, playing the full 90 minutes in a 4–1 home routing of Banfield. He scored his first goal for the club the following 27 April, netting the equalizer in a 2–1 win at Emelec, for the year's Copa Libertadores.

In October 2017, Moreira suffered an injury which took him out of the 2017 Copa Libertadores semifinals. He then subsequently underwent surgery in his right knee, being estimated to return under three months; however, setbacks meant that he only could return in August 2018, nearly ten months from his last appearance.

Portland Timbers
On 20 February 2019, Moreira was acquired by Portland Timbers on loan from Club Atlético River Plate of Argentina. On 18 June 2020, Portland announced that Moreira would return to River Plate after the two club's were unable to agree on a transfer fee to make the move permanent.

International career
Moreira represented Paraguay at under-17 and under-20 levels. On 25 March 2010, he was first called up for the full side by manager Gerardo Martino for a friendly against South Africa.

Moreira made his full international debut on 31 March 2010, replacing Jonathan Santana in the 1–1 draw at the Estadio Defensores del Chaco in Asunción.

Career statistics

Club

International

Honours
Libertad
Paraguayan Primera División: 2010 Clausura, 2012 Clausura, 2014 Apertura, 2014 Clausura, 2016 Apertura

River Plate
Recopa Sudamericana: 2016
Copa Argentina: 2015–16, 2016–17
Supercopa Argentina: 2017
Copa Libertadores: 2018

References

External links

1990 births
Living people
People from Villarrica, Paraguay
Paraguayan footballers
Association football fullbacks
Paraguayan Primera División players
Argentine Primera División players
Major League Soccer players
2 de Mayo footballers
Club Libertad footballers
Club Atlético River Plate footballers
Portland Timbers players
Paraguay under-20 international footballers
Paraguay international footballers
Paraguayan expatriate footballers
Paraguayan expatriate sportspeople in Argentina
Expatriate footballers in Argentina
Paraguayan expatriate sportspeople in the United States
Expatriate soccer players in the United States